Joseph "JS" Sica (August 20, 1911 – November 21, 1982) was a New Jersey mobster involved in armed robbery, murder for hire, extortion, and narcotics distribution. Sica mentored many West Coast mobsters, including Mike Rizzitello and Anthony "the Animal" Fiato. Christopher "Chris" Petti was Sica's longtime partner in the Los Angeles and San Diego rackets. Sica's brothers Alfred, Angelo, and Frank were also associates of Sica's.

Biography
Born in Newark, New Jersey, Sica was first arrested in 1926 at age 15. In 1950, Sica was indicted with 15 other mobsters for conspiracy to distribute narcotics in California.  However, the case was dismissed after Abraham Davidian, the prosecution's star witness, was shot to death while sleeping at his mother's home in Fresno, California.  During the 1950s, the Permanent Subcommittee on Investigations of the U.S. Senate Committee on Government Operations identified Sica as a prominent member of the Los Angeles crime family and an associate of mobsters Mickey Cohen, Salvatore Iannone, and Thomas DeMaio.

Sica once refused an order by L.A. Boss Jack Dragna to kill friend Mickey Cohen. Defying Dragna made Sica a well-respected man amongst Cohen and his bookmakers, but it alienated the L.A. family against him. Cohen's bookies sided with Sica and in an attempt to avoid another gambling war, Sica gave up a piece of his lucrative bookmaking business to Dragna. Sica worked in Los Angeles so long that he eventually became a close associate of the L.A. family.

Joseph Sica died on November 21, 1982.

Further reading
Porrello, Rick. To Kill the Irishman: The War That Crippled the Mafia. Novelty, Ohio: Next Hat Press, 2004. 
United States. Congress. Senate. Committee on the Judiciary, United States. Congress. Senate. Committee on Governmental Affairs. Permanent Subcommittee on Investigations. Status of the Department of Justice Organized Crime Strike Forces. 1990. 
United States. Congress. Senate. Committee on Governmental Affairs. Permanent Subcommittee on Investigations. Profile of Organized Crime: Mid-Atlantic Region Report. 1984. 
Justice, Commerce, the Judiciary, and Related Agencies Appropriations United States. Congress. House. Committee on appropriations. Subcommittee on Departments of State. Departments of State, Justice, and Commerce, the Judiciary, and Related Agencies Appropriations For The Fiscal Year, 1976. 1976. 
Bureau of Narcotics, U.S. Treasury Department, "Mafia: the Government's Secret File on Organized Crime, HarperCollins Publishers 2007

References
Sifakis, Carl. The Mafia Encyclopedia. New York: Da Capo Press, 2005.

External links
CasinoGambling.com: Nevada's Black Book
American Mafia: Kefauver Committee Interim Report #3 May 1, 1951

1911 births
1982 deaths
American gangsters of Italian descent
Los Angeles crime family